Bruce Baker (born 13 March 1950) is  a former Australian rules footballer who played with Fitzroy in the Victorian Football League (VFL). Bruce left Fitzroy in 1971, playing a season for Camberwell in 1972, before moving onto Surrey Hillis in 1973 where he played until he retired in 1977 at the age of 27 due to injury.

Notes

External links 
		

Living people
1950 births
Australian rules footballers from Victoria (Australia)
Fitzroy Football Club players
Tatura Football Club players